The University College of Osteopathy (UCO), formerly the British School of Osteopathy (BSO), is the largest and oldest school of osteopathy in the United Kingdom.
The UCO holds Recognised Qualification (RQ) status from the statutory regulatory body for osteopathy in the UK, the General Osteopathic Council. The institution was granted degree awarding powers in October 2015. It was given University College status in September 2017 from the UK Privy Council, and it is an exempt charity.

History

UCO was founded as the BSO in 1915 by John Martin Littlejohn, an Osteopath himself, but was not incorporated until 1917 due to the First World War. Littlejohn died in 1947 and the school's direction was shaped by several people including Clem Middleton and Margot Gore. The school received charity status in 1963.

In 1984, Princess Anne became the institution's Patron and is currently the Chancellor.

The University College of Osteopathy has a range of undergraduate and postgraduate programmes available to full or part-time students.

The UCO also offers an Access to Higher Education Diploma (Osteopathic Sciences & Health Care) programme. This is a one-year further education course leading to a nationally recognised award. It is designed specifically for students over the age of 18 who wish to become osteopaths or to study a related healthcare discipline at degree level with little or no academic qualifications beyond GCSE level.

There is also an Introduction to Osteopathic Sciences course for potential M.Ost students who have demonstrated academic achievement but lack a solid scientific foundation.

The UCO also offers postgraduate programmes. Examples include a professional doctorate in osteopathy, an MSc in osteopathy and a postgraduate certificate in research methods. It also provides an ongoing programme of continuous professional development courses.

Clinics
UCO students gain experience of contact with patients from the beginning of their studies.

In the last two years of their M.Ost degree course, they gain practical experience by treating members of the public at the UCO's clinical centre under the supervision of tutors who are fully qualified, practising osteopaths.

The UCO's clinical centre is at 98-118 Southwark Bridge Road, London. It is currently Europe's largest osteopathic clinical centre, offering over 40,000 patient appointments per year. It houses the UCO's general clinic, as well as special clinics for expectant mothers, children, people with sports injuries and people with HIV/AIDS.

The UCO also has a portfolio of award-winning community outreach osteopathy clinics, which contribute to the UCO's mission of making osteopathy available to groups of the community that might not otherwise have access to it. These provide students with even more patient contact and osteopathic care to groups such as older people in their homes, homeless people, people with HIV/AIDS and children with social, emotional and behavioural problems.

List of BSO Principals and UCO Vice-Chancellors
BSO Dean (1917 to 1947)
 1917 to 1947 - John Martin Littlejohn

BSO Principal (1948 to 2002) 
 1948 to 1968 - Shilton Webster-Jones
 1968 to 1977 - Colin Dove
 1977 to 1982 - Stanley Bradford
 1982 to 1990 - Sir Norman Lindop
 1990 to 1998 - Clive Standen
 1998 to 2002 - Martin Collins

BSO Principal and Chief Executive (2002 to 2017)
 2002 to 2006 - Martin Collins
 2006 to 2017 - Charles Hunt

UCO Vice-Chancellor (From 2017)
 From 2017 - Charles Hunt

See also
 List of osteopathic colleges

References

External links
Official The University College of Osteopathy website
Official The University College of Osteopathy clinic
General Osteopathic Council official website

Educational institutions established in 1915
1915 establishments in the United Kingdom
Universities and colleges in London
Osteopathic colleges in the United Kingdom